A list of animated feature films first released in 1991.

Highest-grossing animated films of the year

See also
 List of animated television series of 1991

References

 Feature films
1991
1991-related lists